There are at least 64 named mountain ranges in the U.S. state of Washington.  Names, elevations and coordinates from the U.S. Geological Survey, Geographic Names Information System and trail guides published by The Mountaineers. Some of the ranges extend into neighboring states of Idaho and Oregon and British Columbia, Canada.

See also

 List of mountain ranges of Oregon

Notes

Washington (state), List of mountain ranges in
Mountain ranges of the Western United States
Mountain ranges